Beka Records  was a record label based in Germany, active from about 1903 to 1925. Before World War I, Beka also made gramophone records for the United Kingdom market under the Beka-Grand Records label.  The company became a subsidiary of the Carl Lindström Company which was sold to the Columbia Graphophone Company in 1926.

Artists on the label included Bert Alvey, Jessie Broughton, Albertina Cassani, Lucia Cavalli, Cook & Carpenter, Gerhard Ebeler, Kappelle Willy Krug, Kapelle Merton, Miss Riboet, Phillip Ritte, the Beka London Orchestra, the Dobbri Saxophone Orchestra, the Martina Salon Orchestra, the Meister Orchestra, and the Royal Cowes Minstrels.

A history of Beka Records, together with a listing of known records issued by the label, is published by the City of London Phonograph and Gramophone Society (CLPGS) as part of their Reference Series of books.

See also 
 List of record labels

External links
 Photo of the Beka label

German record labels
Defunct record labels of Germany
Record labels established in 1903
Record labels disestablished in 1925
Classical music record labels